José Vásquez may refer to:

Sports
José Vásquez, water polo player for Mexico at the 1968 Summer Olympics
José Luis Vásquez (born 1957), Peruvian former football player and manager
José Sebastián Vásquez (born 1982), Argentine footballer
Jose Vasquez (soccer) (born 1969), retired Mexican-American soccer player
José Vásquez (beach volleyball) (born 1972), Venezuelan beach volleyball player at the 2002 Central American and Caribbean Games
José Vásquez (judoka) (born 1979), Dominican Republic judoka
Jose Vasquez (ice hockey) (born 1985), American ice hockey player who played for the Indiana Blizzards, Queen City Storm and West Michigan Blizzard

Other
Bishop José Vásquez Silos, who ordained Francisco Robles Ortega
José Arturo Vásquez Machado (died 2009), governor of Cabañas department in the Republic of El Salvador, 1994–2003

See also 
José Vazquez (disambiguation)